The Global Development And Environment Institute (GDAE, pronounced “gee-day”) is a research center at Tufts University founded in 1993. GDAE conducts research and develops teaching materials in economics and related areas that follow an interdisciplinary approach that emphasizes ecological, cultural, social, and institutional factors. The Institute has produced more than twenty books and numerous articles, policy documents, and discussion papers. These materials are being used in academic settings, to enhance the teaching of economics and related subjects, and in policy circles, where GDAE researchers are recognized leaders in their fields.

Texts and educational modules developed at GDAE are now being distributed and managed through Boston University’s Economics in Context Initiative. This carries forward the effort to develop a truly “contextual economics” – one that takes full account of humanity’s social and physical environments.

GDAE’s current research and educational efforts are centered in three areas: “Land, Energy, and Climate”, Green Economics, and educational materials in Environmental and Natural Resource Economics.  GDAE researchers present their research in a series of policy briefs, working papers, and at numerous conferences. GDAE’s earlier research and publications include areas such as globalization, trade, and feminist economics.

Personnel 
Neva Goodwin and William Moomaw are Co-Directors of GDAE. Other members of the research team are Jonathan M. Harris, Brian Roach and Anne-Marie Codur. Monica Barros is responsible for administration and communications. Gillian Davies, Andrew Tirrell, and David Sussman are Visiting Scholars at GDAE, and Jeronim Capaldo is a research fellow. Bethany Tietjen and Josephine Watson are GDAE Research Assistants.

Research 
GDAE’s research program emphasizes ecological health and the correlation between social and economic well-being. They view economic systems in physical contexts of technology and the natural world, as well as in the social/psychological contexts of history, politics, ethics, culture, institutions, and human motivations.

Publications
GDAE has extensive publication record, including the production of the ‘In-Context’ series of textbooks and free teaching modules which are now managed by the Economics in Context Initiative at Boston University.

Textbooks 
The textbooks in question include Microeconomics in Context, Macroeconomics in Context, Macroeconomics in Context (European Edition), Principles of Economics in Context, Environmental and Resource Economics and the soon to be published Essentials of Economics in Context.

These textbooks present all the content required of a standard text yet also go beyond this material to offer a more holistic approach to understanding economic processes by integrating aspects of history, institutions, gender, inequality, and the environment.

The texts come with a full set of supplementary materials including instructor resource material with lecture outlines, a test bank of over 2,000 questions, and PowerPoint slides. Detailed student study guides are available for free download.

Modules 
GDAE has also produced an extensive set of teaching modules that are designed for use as stand-alone supplements in undergraduate or graduate-level courses. These modules are available as free downloadable PDFs.  They range from 25-60 pages, and most include discussion questions and glossary. The teaching modules are designed to allow instructors to easily incorporate the teaching modules into one or more weeks of weeks of semester alongside whatever textbooks they are using.

Frontier Issues in Economic Thought 
GDAE produced the six-volume series, Frontier Issues in Economic Thought, which was published by Island Press. The articles that GDAE researchers selected and summarized for this project focus on the limitations of the mainstream economic paradigm and a wide range of creative efforts that have been and are being made to extend economic understanding.

Social Science Library: Frontier Thinking in Sustainable Development and Human Well-being 
GDAE has produced an electronic collection of publications that are available for free to universities in 138 nations, with special attention to those institutions that are most in need of library resources. The collection, or the Social Science Library (SSL), contains over 3,400 full-text journal articles, book chapters, reports, and working papers in anthropology, economics, history, philosophy, social psychology, sociology and political science. It also includes full bibliographic references (including abstracts) to more than 6,000 additional articles. The SSL is available upon request to those that qualify for access. For people who are not in the recipient countries, a web-based version, with the 10,000+ bibliographic entries, but without the full text PDFs is available on request.

Leontief Prize
In 2000, GDAE established the Leontief Prize.  Named in honor of Wassily Leontief, member of the GDAE advisory board and recipient of the Nobel Memorial Prize in Economic Sciences, the annual award recognizes outstanding contributions to economic theory that address contemporary realities and support just and sustainable societies.

2000 – Amartya Sen and John Kenneth Galbraith
2001 – Herman E. Daly and Paul P. Streeten
2002 – Alice Amsden and Dani Rodrik
2003 - No Award Given
2004 – Robert H. Frank and Nancy Folbre
2005 – Ha-Joon Chang and Richard R. Nelson
2006 – Juliet Schor and Samuel Bowles
2007 - Jomo Kwame Sundaram and Stephen DeCanio
2008 - José Antonio Ocampo and Robert Wade
2009 - No Award Given
2010 - Bina Agarwal and Daniel Kahneman
2011 - Nicholas Stern and Martin Weitzman
2012 - Michael Lipton and C. Peter Timmer
2013 - Albert O. Hirschman and Frances Stewart
2014 - Angus Deaton and James K. Galbraith
2015 - Duncan K. Foley and Lance Taylor
2016 - Amit Bhaduri and Diane Elson
2017 - James Boyce and Joan Martinez Alier
2018 - Mariana Mazzucato and Branko Milanovic

References

External links
Global Development and Environment Institute at Tufts University
Economics in Context Initiative at Boston University

Research institutes in Massachusetts
Economics education
Economics of sustainability
Economics awards
Global economic research
Tufts University
Environmental research institutes